Echo Bridge is a historic masonry bridge spanning the Charles River between Needham to Newton Upper Falls, Massachusetts, and Ellis Street in Newton. The bridge carries the Sudbury Aqueduct and foot traffic, and is located in the Hemlock Gorge Reservation. At the time of its construction in 1875–1877, it was the second longest masonry arch in the country. 

The bridge was listed on the National Register of Historic Places in 1980, and was named an American Water Landmark in 1981.

Description
The bridge crosses over Hemlock Gorge where the Charles River passes over the fall line in Newton Upper Falls. There are still old mill buildings in view from the bridge, but most of the gorge remains naturally overgrown with hemlocks. The bridge has two viewing locations, the pedestrian walk on top of the bridge and a platform underneath where visitors can hear the eponymous echoes. Views include white water, a waterfall and the hemlock-lined gorge. The  Hemlock Gorge Reservation including the gorge is maintained by the Massachusetts Department of Conservation and Recreation. The bridge is located just off Route 9 where it crosses Route 128. Despite being in the midst of a tangle of highways, the river itself is tree-lined and natural.

The bridge's foundations are made of granite resting on bedrock.

The bridge was closed to the public for much of 2006 to permit repairs of the railings, which were decaying and which do not meet modern safety codes.  Because of the cost of rebuilding the historic railings, chain link fencing was installed on each side, allowing the bridge to be reopened. This fencing was later replaced by a set of modern railings inside the historic railings. Efforts are underway to secure funding to reconstruct the historic railings.  

The aqueduct, which has been serving only as an emergency backup for some years, was reactivated during a state of emergency declared on May 1, 2010. The line was used to carry clean water to parts of 38 communities affected by a catastrophic failure elsewhere in the MWRA system.

Photo gallery

See also
List of bridges documented by the Historic American Engineering Record in Massachusetts
National Register of Historic Places listings in Newton, Massachusetts
National Register of Historic Places listings in Norfolk County, Massachusetts

References

External links

The Friends of Hemlock Gorge
Hemlock Gorge Reservation Newton Conservators
The science behind the arch's echo

National Register of Historic Places in Newton, Massachusetts
National Register of Historic Places in Cambridge, Massachusetts
National Register of Historic Places in Norfolk County, Massachusetts
Bridges on the National Register of Historic Places in Massachusetts
Bridges on the National Register of Historic Places
Water transportation buildings and structures on the National Register of Historic Places
Bridges completed in 1877
Bridges over the Charles River
Buildings and structures in Newton, Massachusetts
Buildings and structures in Needham, Massachusetts
Bridges in Middlesex County, Massachusetts
Bridges in Norfolk County, Massachusetts
Historic American Engineering Record in Massachusetts
Historic district contributing properties in Massachusetts
Arch bridges in the United States
1877 establishments in Massachusetts